The 2018 Laurence Olivier Awards was held on 8 April 2018 at the Royal Albert Hall, London. The ceremony was hosted by comedian and actress Catherine Tate.

Hamilton was nominated for a record 13 awards, ultimately claiming seven awards.

Eligibility 
Any new production that opened between 22 February 2017 and 21 February 2018 in a theatre represented in the membership of the Society of London Theatre is eligible for consideration, provided it has performed at least 30 performances.

Event calendar
2 March: Catherine Tate announced as the host.
6 March: Nominations announced by Alexandra Burke and Elaine Paige on Facebook Live
8 April: Award ceremony held

Winners and nominees
The nominations were announced on 6 March 2018 in 25 categories.

Productions with multiple wins and nominations

Multiple wins 
The following productions received multiple awards:

 7: Hamilton 
 3: The Ferryman 
 2: Angels in America, Follies, Girl from the North Country, Semiramide

Hamilton matched the record set by Matilda the Musical in the 2012 ceremony by winning 7 Olivier Awards, including Best New Musical.

Multiple nominations 
The following productions, including one opera, received multiple nominations:
 13: Hamilton
 10: Follies
 8: The Ferryman
 6: Angels in America
 5: Everybody's Talking About Jamie, Girl from the North Country
 4: Ink, Network 
 3: 42nd Street, An American in Paris, Hamlet, Who's Afraid of Virginia Woolf?, Young Frankenstein
 2: Dick Whittington, Oslo, Semiramide
Hamilton broke the record for most nominations by a single production with 13 nominations. This title was previously held by Harry Potter and the Cursed Child at the 2017 ceremony and Hairspray at the 2008 ceremony; both received 11 nominations.

Guest performers 
 The cast of Hamilton performing 'Alexander Hamilton'
 Lesley Joseph and the cast of Young Frankenstein performing 'Puttin' On the Ritz'
 Tracie Bennett from Follies performing 'I'm Still Here'
 Clare Halse and the cast of 42nd Street performing '42nd Street'
 John McCrea and the cast of Everybody's Talking About Jamie performing 'And You Don't Even Know It'
 Sheila Atim and the cast of Girl From The North Country performing 'Tight Connection To My Heart'
 Chita Rivera, Andy Karl and Adam J. Bernard and choir of the Arts Education School performing 'Somewhere' from West Side Story during the In Memoriam section and celebrating 60 years since the original London production.
 Jason Donovan, Linzi Hateley, Lee Mead, Preeya Kalidas, Joe McElderry and Danielle Hope performing the prologue and 'Any Dream Will Do' from Joseph and the Amazing Technicolor Dreamcoat, celebrating the 50th anniversary of the show.

See also 
 72nd Tony Awards

References

External links 
 Olivier Awards official website

2018 theatre awards
2018 awards in the United Kingdom
Laurence Olivier Awards ceremonies
April 2018 events in the United Kingdom
2018 in London
Events at the Royal Albert Hall